Frederick Westlake (Romsey, Hampshire, 25 February 1840 - London, 12 February 1898) was English pianist and composer.

Westlake studied at the Royal Academy of Music with W. Macfarren (piano) and G. A. Macfarren (harmony); in 1862 was appointed to the faculty as piano teacher. He wrote several Masses, hymns, piano pieces, and a collection of part-songs, Lyra Studentium.

External links
 

English composers
19th-century classical composers
1840 births
1898 deaths
English male classical composers
English classical composers
19th-century English musicians
People from Romsey
19th-century British composers
19th-century British male musicians